is a 1968 novel by Yukio Mishima. It was first serialised twenty-one times in the weekly magazine Weekly Playboy between 21 May 1968 and 8 October 1968. It was published in hardcover format by Shueisha on 25 December 1968. It was published in paperback by Chikuma Bunko on 24 February 1998. The novel was translated into English by Stephen Dodd and published in paperback format in the United Kingdom by Penguin Classics on 1 August 2019. The English translation received a wider release in paperback by Vintage International on 21 April 2020.

In 2018, the novel was adapted as a BS TV Tokyo television drama starring Aoi Nakamura as Hanio Yamada.

Plot
Hanio Yamada is a 27-year-old copywriter for Tokyo Ad who, after a suicide attempt, quits his job and advertises his own life for sale in a Tokyo newspaper. Yamada's life is shaken up when he agrees to the increasingly bizarre requests of those who respond to his offer.

Publication
Life for Sale was first serialised in Weekly Playboy twenty-one times between 21 May and 8 October in 1968. It was domestically published in hardcover format by Shueisha on 25 December 1968 and in paperback by Chikuma Bunko thirty years later on 24 February 1998. The novel was translated into English by Stephen Dodd, the Professor of Japanese Literature at the School of Oriental and African Studies, and published in paperback format in the United Kingdom by Penguin Classics on 1 August 2019. The English translation received a wider release in paperback by Vintage International on 21 April 2020.

Reception

Translation
Publishers Weekly gave the novel a positive review, writing, "Mishima's pungent insights into the challenges of postwar Japanese life are threaded brilliantly throughout" but felt, "The novel handles its female characters poorly, using them in a disposable way that feels dated."

David Barnett, writing for The Independent, called the novel "funny and horrific and curious and thoroughly entertaining and should win Mishima a new generation of fans."

James Smart of The Guardian wrote, "It may be only a footnote in his career, but this surreal tale offers a trenchant critique of a city that has misplaced its soul."

Writing for the Evening Standard, Ian Thomson gave the novel a rave review, calling it "a sexy, camp delight. Beneath the hard- boiled dialogue and the gangster high jinks is a familiar indictment of consumerist Japan and a romantic yearning for the past."

Writing for the New Statesman, philosopher John Gray said, "Life for Sale is not a great work of fiction, but it succeeds in capturing vividly the bathos of the self-pitying modern nihilist."

Andrew Taylor, writing for The Spectator, praised the novel, writing, "This existential crime novel has an arresting premise and Mishima plays it for all it's worth."

Television adaptation
The novel was adapted as a BS TV Tokyo television drama in 2018, starring Aoi Nakamura as Hanio Yamada.

References

External links
 

1968 novels
20th-century Japanese novels
Novels by Yukio Mishima
Shueisha books
Novels set in Tokyo
Black comedy books
Works originally published in Weekly Playboy
Novels first published in serial form
Japanese novels adapted into television shows
1968 in Japan
Satirical novels
Japanese crime novels